Charles Herbert Lockyer Young (7 December 1877 – 22 February 1914) was an Australian rules footballer who played the Melbourne Football Club in the Victorian Football League (VFL). He became one of the club's first premiership players, playing in the 1900 VFL Grand Final, under the captaincy of Dick Wardill. Young made his debut against  in Round 1 of the 1897 VFL season, at the Lake Oval, and topped the club's goalkicker tally in 1898. He has been given the Melbourne Heritage Number of 20, based on the order of his debut for the club. Young was named in 2008 as a "legend of the game" on the club's 150th anniversary.

References

External links

 

1877 births
1914 deaths
Melbourne Football Club players
Australian rules footballers from Melbourne
Melbourne Football Club Premiership players
One-time VFL/AFL Premiership players
People from Kew, Victoria